Buddy's Trolley Troubles is an American animated short film. It is a Looney Tunes cartoon, featuring Buddy, the second star of the series. It was released on May 5, 1934 and is the third cartoon supervised by Friz Freleng. Musical direction was by Norman Spencer.

Summary
Buddy is a motorman on the urban line: he leaves his home, whistling the tune of the song that he shall sing as he sets out on his run. Creatively employing a piece of his picket fence as a track, he drives his trolley car out of his shed. He stops for a large lady, whom he assists in boarding the car, and starts again before a male passenger can board. The gentleman chases the car, eventually catching up and winning a great deal of money upon dropping five cents.

Once Buddy's car has emptied, he picks up Cookie, which he accomplishes by extending the height of his streetcar by an accordion apparatus underneath the vehicle. Of course, the detour obstructs traffic and attracts the unwelcome attention of an unfriendly traffic officer, who does not allow Buddy to speak. Upon Cookie's defense of Buddy, the officer punches Our Hero in the nose, commanding him to move on. Obeying, Buddy extends an arm-shaped stop signal from his car and drives, the signal knocking the officer on to his face.

Buddy and Cookie continue to ride, and perilously outrun and then avoid a large locomotive. Elsewhere, a prisoner in a striped uniform, ball-and-chain at his ankle, stands in a ditch and hammers at his bounds with a large rock, to no effect. Hearing Buddy's trolley car approaching on the track that runs over the ditch, the prisoner throws his chain over the track & latches on to a branch (failing on first attempt.) The car compromises the chain, and the felon is free. Buddy's car stops, and he steps out of the driver's seat to inspect the vehicle. The prisoner, meanwhile, seeing Cookie through the motorcar window, commandeers the driver's seat whilst Buddy is distracted; Cookie screams, Buddy expresses his indignation, but the villain knocks Our Hero backwards, leaving his sweetheart to yell for help.

Buddy quickly regains his senses, and takes under his control a handcar, eventually grabbing on to the wire of the trolley car, kicking the thief in the face, twice, and then taking Cookie and swinging over to his emergency vehicle. The jailbreak soon sees that he is to collide with a stalled truck full of dynamite, and though the owner of the truck attempts to start his motor, it is no use and both streetcar and transport truck explode. The owner of the truck is left quite scarred and dazed, and the prisoner is dizzily seated on the ground of a pig pen. Buddy and Cookie step over to the helpless villain, and Buddy seals him in by extending the fence of the pen. Several piglets emerge humorously to annoy the trumped bruiser.

Similarity and Differences to other shorts
Buddy's Trolley Troubles is similar, in some respects, to other shorts: Oswald the Lucky Rabbit, in 1927, starred in a cartoon called Trolley Troubles, in which he runs a streetcar; and an earlier Warner Bros. character called Foxy ran a trolley car during a long dream sequence in the Harman-Ising Merrie Melody Smile, Darn Ya, Smile!, in which he, amongst other things, rings his bell by means of a cat, operates car no. 13, picks up his sweetheart and helps a large lady passenger board.

Both “Smile Darn Ya, Smile” and “Trolley Troubles” had the same plot of the short such as the runaway trolley, which was identified from the Mickey Mouse short “Mickey’s Choo-Choo” (Boxcar) and Bosko's “Sinkin’ In The Bathtub” (Car). “Buddy’s Trolley Troubles” does not have the type of plot, so does Toonerville Trolley and Trolley Ahoy from the Rainbow Parade series.

Katz Beer
As Buddy's car approaches Cookie's building, we see a billboard advertising "Katz Beer," a reference to Ray Katz, Leon Schlesinger's business assistant.

References

External links
 
 

1934 films
1934 animated films
1930s American animated films
1930s animated short films
American black-and-white films
Films scored by Norman Spencer (composer)
Short films directed by Friz Freleng
Buddy (Looney Tunes) films
Looney Tunes shorts
Films about prison escapes
Rail transport films
1930s English-language films